A list of animated television series first aired in 1984.

See also
 List of animated feature films of 1984
 List of Japanese animation television series of 1984

Television series
Animated series
1984
1984
1984-related lists